Lincoln is an unincorporated community in the town of Lincoln, Kewaunee County, Wisconsin, United States.

History
Lincoln was originally called "Grandlez" in the nineteenth century.

References

Unincorporated communities in Kewaunee County, Wisconsin
Unincorporated communities in Wisconsin